Sonia Deepti (born 29 July 1984) is an Indian actress who has primarily appeared in Telugu films. Her debut performance as Shravs in the 2007 Sekhar Kammula film Happy Days won her the Filmfare Award for Best Supporting Actress – Telugu.

Career
Sonia Deepti was born and brought up in Hyderabad, Telangana. After finishing her studies with a degree in computer applications, she worked as a software engineer in an IT company for three years, before stepping into acting. At an event, she was spotted by Sekhar Kammula, who gave her an acting offer, after seeing her performance in an audition. Accepting the offer, she made her acting debut in the 2007 Telugu film Happy Days, enacting the role of Shravs. The film, upon release, became a blockbuster and won six awards at the 2008 Filmfare Awards South, one of which was the Award for Best Supporting Actress for Sonia for her performance that won her critical acclaim.

In late 2008, her second film Vinayakudu opposite Krishnudu, one of her co-actors in Happy Days, was released, which went on to become a successful venture as well. She soon got offers from the Tamil film industry as well and made her debut in Tamil with the N. Lingusamy-directed romantic-action film Paiyaa in 2010. That year she had another Tamil film releasing, Inidhu Inidhu, a remake of Happy Days, in which she reprised her role from the original. Sonia played the role of Samantha's character's friend in the 2011 Telugu film Dookudu.

She made her debut in Kannada with the film Ninnindale starring Puneeth Rajkumar and Erica Fernandes, which was released in January 2014.

On the eve of International Women's Day in 2015, she released a short film on her YouTube channel. Scripted by Megha Wali, this film questions legality and legitimacy of moral policing. It was well received on social media and appreciated by many stars including Ram Gopal Varma and Amitabh Bachchan. It was shot at Country Club in Hyderabad.

Filmography

References

External links 

 

Indian film actresses
Actresses in Telugu cinema
Actresses in Tamil cinema
Living people
Filmfare Awards South winners
Actresses from Hyderabad, India
Actresses in Kannada cinema
21st-century Indian actresses
Female models from Hyderabad, India
1984 births